Mortal Online is a first-person, open-world, PvP/PvE sandbox MMORPG developed and published by the Swedish independent video game company Star Vault. Mortal Online was released on June 9, 2010. The game is inspired by the desire to return to Ultima Online's player-controlled, sandbox-style game design; it uses Epic Games' Unreal Engine 3 and features a skill-based, real-time combat system.

Mortal Online does not have a traditional level/class system, but rather a skill and attribute system similar to the Elder Scrolls series. There are ten different races for the player to choose from, including an orc-human hybrid, five human races, two elf-like races, and two dwarf-like races. In order to experience multiple possible playstyles, players can have up to four characters per account (increased from three in December 2012).

Development
In October 2010, approximately four months after its official release, Mortal Online's game engine was rebuilt, making it possible for its developers to implement better graphics, increase performance and introduce advanced features which were previously not possible on the older engine. In May 2011, the film Playing with Arnold was released, in which Basshunter invited friends and fans to play together.

In June 2011, the game's first expansion titled "Dawn" was released. It introduced graphical and performance improvements; new features like the need to eat, drink and sleep; health, stamina and mana "reserves", a gene system for mounts, changes to the riding and related mechanics, a task system which allows players to create quests for others to do, a new housing system, character skills, world interactive objects, new pick-able resources including a wide selection of plants, an in-town mail system with cash-on-delivery to ease player trading and an updated game launcher.

The deployment of Dawn suffered many technical issues, leading to extended server downtime and certain game features being disabled directly after the release. Additions such as the gene system and cooking were initially poorly received by some players, especially when raw food was better than cooked food for in-game purposes. This, combined with early balancing issues, lead to extensive weight loss among player avatars which in turn caused attribute penalties.

In September 2011, Star Vault formed a "Focus Group" - essentially a test and early feedback group for upcoming releases and patches. Members of the group are active players that have signed a non-disclosure agreement with Star Vault. The purpose of the Focus Group is to augment Star Vault's limited internal resource and act as an additional quality assurance level before new releases and patches reach the general playing audience.

In late August 2012, the game's second expansion titled "The Awakening" was released which promised notable new features like trade brokers, player-written books, revamped GUI, the unveiling of Tindrem, roaming guards of varying ranks, advanced AI for NPCs, illegal items, additional skills and a host of other improvements and fixes. Star Vault advised the community ahead of time that the expansion deployment would suffer from problems, and have released a number of patches post-launch. The expansion introduced a multitude of bugs that affect the game's mechanics, performance and stability.

In late November 2012, Star Vault began to offer a "Free to Play" option. Restrictions to free-account players include a limitation of 60 (of 100) in all skills, restricted looting and trading of rare objects, and the inability to make use of thieving skills. In addition, new accounts must pay to unlock additional characters slots while legacy accounts retain all characters and character slots they made use of prior to the Free-to-Play change.

In mid-May 2015 the game’s third expansion titled "Sarducaa" was released and introduced the new continent of Sarducca which more than doubled the land mass, added a variety of new items and armors as well introducing a new "heat system" that caused players stamina and health to be affected by the temperature on the new continent. Up to this point there had been no transitional loading screens between areas within the Myrland continent; however, with the introduction of Sarducca, players would now encounter a bridge ‘connecting’ the two continents together.

Gameplay

Mortal Online has both PvP and PvE content, with the design focus on PvP.

PvE, Crafting, and Exploration
Other than robbing from, dueling with, and killing other players' avatars, players can craft weapons, shields, armor; build houses, keeps, and palisades; hunt and butcher animals for use in crafting and cooking; tame animals; mine, and ultimately refine rocks into precious metals; train their skills; or explore. Player-built structures can be attacked and destroyed by players, and certain wild animals that have been tamed can also be mounted, including horses and rhino-like creatures called Molva Beasts.

Flagging System
Regarding the PvP content, Mortal Online has an FFA (Free-For-All) PvP system with consequences for killing other players in the form of "flags" which range from yellow (fledgling), to blue (innocent), to grey (criminal), to red (murderer). Being a criminal in Mortal Online (also known as being locally or globally "allowed") means that other players can either attack you without being flagged themselves, or can call the NPC guards on you in certain towns. Doing certain offensive or aggressive actions in the game will also flag the offending player "allowed", for example getting caught pick pocketing or simply pushing another player too many times within a short period of time. When a player dies, all of the items in their inventory drop to the ground in a loot bag, which is lootable by all other players and disappears over a period of time. Starting with the Dawn expansion, the loot bag also includes the corpse and the head of the player.

Nudity, gore and brutality
Avatars that do not wear armor or clothes are completely naked. Naked players are a relatively common sight, either because they choose so or because they were killed and have not had a chance to restock. When the avatar is killed, the player loot bag includes a corpse and a named head. Corpses can be consumed, butchered or cooked. The heads can be collected as trophies or eaten. Occasionally, heads of well-known players are offered for sale on the game's official forums or the in-game trade brokers. Butchering a corpse yields materials including skin which can be used to craft clothes.

Player-made Content
Guilds can maintain their own keeps and palisades, and can contest control of certain cities. In addition to activity caused by player interaction, in-game events are triggered by developers and gamemasters, with examples such as a sudden, unexpected infestation of a town or area by giant spiders, zombies and undead creatures or wildlife such as springboks.

Notes

External links 
 Official Website
 https://web.archive.org/web/20180327120217/http://www.mortalonline.com/forums/

2010 video games
Active massively multiplayer online games
Massively multiplayer online role-playing games
First-person adventure games
Multiplayer online games
Unreal Engine games
Video games developed in Sweden
Windows games
Windows-only games